The 1978 North Carolina A&T Aggies football team represented North Carolina A&T State University as member of the Mid-Eastern Athletic Conference (MEAC) during the 1978 NCAA Division I-AA football season. Led by second-year head coach James McKinley, the Aggies compiled and overall record of 6–6 with a mark of 4–2 in conference play, placing second in the MEAC.

Schedule

Roster

References 

North Carolina AandT
North Carolina A&T Aggies football seasons
North Carolina AandT Aggies football